Doomsday: Forever RSO is the only full-length studio album by rap group The Almighty RSO. It was released on November 19, 1996 through Rap-A-Lot Records. The album only did slightly better than the group's previous release, peaking at 52 on the Top R&B/Hip-Hop Albums. It featured Havoc-produced single, "The War's On" featuring Prodigy, which also appeared on the Original Gangstas soundtrack. The second and the only charting single in the group's brief history, "You Could Be My Boo" featuring Faith Evans, peaked at 10 on the Hot Rap Songs chart.

Track listing
"Doomsday Intro"- :38  
"Forever RSO"- 4:38  
"The War's On"- 4:23 (Featuring Prodigy) (Produced by Havoc)
"Thought You Knew"- 4:24  
"Gotta Be a Better Way"- 3:55  
"Summer Knightz"- 4:06  
"Sanity"- 4:16  
"You'll Never Know"- 4:32 (Featuring Mad Lion) 
"You Could Be My Boo"- 4:47 (Featuring Faith Evans)
"Mix of Action"- 4:31  
"Keep Alive"- 4:11  
"Illicit Activity"- 5:15 (Featuring 8Ball & MJG) 
"Killin' Em"- 3:35  
"One In tha Chamba"- 4:28 (Featuring Cocoa Brovaz & M.O.P.)
"Quarter Past Nine"- 4:32  
"We'll Remember You"- 3:42

References 

1996 albums
Virgin Records albums
Rap-A-Lot Records albums
Albums produced by KayGee
Albums produced by Havoc (musician)